Tsetserleg (lit. "garden") is a sum of Khövsgöl aimag, Mongolia. The area is 7,480 km2, of which 6,040 km2 are pasture and 1,340 km2 are forest. 15 km2 are farmland. In 2000, Tsetserleg had a population of 5,876 people, mainly Khotgoid. The sum center, officially named Khalban, is located 209 km west of Mörön and 880 km from Ulaanbaatar.

History 

A Tsetserleg sum was formed from parts of the Khantaishir uulyn aimag's Delgerkhaan uulyn khoshuu in 1930. In 1931, some bags were added, and in 1933, Tsetserleg sum had roughly 3,800 inhabitants in 1150 households, and 92,000 heads of livestock. In 1954, the local Enkh-Amidral negdel was founded.

Economy 

In 2004, there were about 110,000 heads of livestock, among them 45,000 goats, 48,000 sheep, 8,300 cattle and yaks, 8,100 horses, and 606 camels.

Miscellaneous 

Tesiin Khüree, one of the largest monasteries in this part of Mongolia, was founded close to where now the sum center is located in 1717. At its best times, the monastery housed 1,500 lamas and consisted of 6 aimags (big temples), 16 datsans (medium-sized temples), and 29 dugans (small temples). Tesiin Khüree was destroyed in the late 1930s.

References

Literature 

M. Nyamaa, Khövsgöl aimgiin lavlakh toli, Ulaanbaatar 2001, p. 201f

Districts of Khövsgöl Province